"If It Ain't About Money" is the second single from Fat Joe's tenth studio album The Darkside Vol. 1. It features R&B singer Trey Songz.

On May 22, 2010, Cool & Dre announced via Twitter that Fat Joe's second single, titled "It Aint About Money" featuring Trey Songz would be premièred on Funkmaster Flex's radio show on May 24, 2010. In the tweet, a link to a video was provided where Fat Joe confirmed the news while a sample of the song was playing in the background.

Music video
The video, which was directed by Parris and stars Fat Joe and Trey Songz with cameo appearances by Waka Flocka Flame, Cool & Dre and DJ Khaled, was premiered on BET's 106 & Park on July 3, 2010

Charts

References

2010 singles
2010 songs
Fat Joe songs
Trey Songz songs
Song recordings produced by Cool & Dre
Songs written by Cool (record producer)
Songs written by Trey Songz
Songs written by Fat Joe
Songs written by August Rigo
MNRK Music Group singles
Songs written by Dre (record producer)